Murchison River may refer to the following:

 Murchison River (New Zealand)
 Murchison River (Tasmania)
 Murchison River (Western Australia)
 Murchison River (Nunavut) (Kuuk)
 Murchison River Gorge

See also 
 Murchison (disambiguation)